Stuck On Repeat is the debut and only studio album by American pop rock band Stereo Skyline.

Track listing

Bonus tracks
"Build Me Up Buttercup" (iTunes Bonus Track) (2:43)

Charts

Credits
Kevin Bard - Guitar, Composer, Vocals, Producer, Group Member
Matt Craig - Engineer
Carson Donnelly - A&R
Doug Fenske - Engineer
Meghan Foley - Art Direction
Eshy Gazit - Engineer
Serban Ghenea - Mixing
Blake Healy - Composer, Producer, Additional Production
Sam Hollander - Composer
Clayton Johnson - Guitar, Group Member
Jon Kaplan - Mixing
Dave Katz - Composer
Andrew Keller - A&R
Brian Maddox - Bass, Group Member
Scott Mann - Producer, Engineer
Andy Marcinkowski - Mixing Assistant
Vlado Meller - Mastering
Rob Michelsen - Drums, Group Member
Chad Royce - Producer, Engineer
S*A*M - Producer
Adam Schlesinger - Composer
Eric Stenman - Engineer
Jayme Thornton - Photography

References

2010 debut albums
Stereo Skyline albums
Albums produced by S*A*M and Sluggo